Jean-Étienne is a French given name. Notable people with the name include:

 Jean-Étienne Antoinette (born 1966), French Guianan politician
 Jean-Étienne Championnet (1762–1800), French general
 Jean-Étienne Despréaux (1748–1820), French dancer and singer
 Jean-Étienne Dominique Esquirol (1772–1840), French psychiatrist
 Jean-Étienne Guettard (1715–1786), French naturalist and mineralogist
 Jean-Étienne Marie (1917–1989), French composer
 Jean-Étienne Montucla (1725–1799), French mathematician
 Jean-Étienne Liotard (1702–1789), Swiss-French painter
 Jean-Étienne Valluy (1899–1970), French general 
 Jean-Étienne Waddens (1738–1782), Swiss-Canadian fur trader

See also 
 Jean (male given name)
 Étienne (disambiguation)

French masculine given names
Compound given names